NHL (colloquially referred to as Chel) is a series of professional ice hockey simulation video games developed by EA Vancouver and published yearly by Electronic Arts under the EA Sports brand. The game is developed under license from the National Hockey League (NHL), which enables the use of the league's team names, stadiums and colors in the game, and the National Hockey League Players' Association (NHLPA), which enables the use of the League's player names and likenesses.

Installments

Leagues 

In addition to the NHL itself, the different installments of the game include development leagues like the American Hockey League and ECHL, European national leagues from Russia, Sweden, Finland, Germany, Austria, Switzerland and Czech Republic, and the European Champions Hockey League.

Game covers 

As is traditional with EA Sports, the NHL series boxes feature live action photos instead of drawings. As it lacked the NHLPA license, the early titles staged photos without real players. NHLPA Hockey 93, on the other hand, had the rights to use player images, but not of the teams. On this cover, the main action photo features the New York Rangers' Randy Moller checking the Philadelphia Flyers' Rod Brind'Amour while Rangers goaltender Mike Richter makes a save (in this photo there is the logo of the New York Rangers located on the bottom right of the goaltender's pants). This photo is surrounded by eight small portraits of players (Steve Yzerman, Andy Moog, Pat LaFontaine, Brian Leetch, Ray Bourque, Patrick Roy, Jeremy Roenick, and Rick Tocchet). This changed with NHL 94, which featured a goal situation for Tomas Sandstrom (Los Angeles Kings) against Andy Moog (Boston Bruins). NHL 95 featured an in-goal camera during a goal scored by Alexei Kovalev of the New York Rangers during the 1994 Stanley Cup Finals against Kirk McLean of the Vancouver Canucks. NHL 96 featured New Jersey's Scott Stevens and Detroit's Steve Yzerman. More recently, Claude Giroux was featured on the cover of NHL 13 and Martin Brodeur was on the cover of NHL 14. On June 24, 2014, EA Sports announced at the 2014 NHL Awards in Las Vegas that Patrice Bergeron of the Boston Bruins would be the official cover athlete for NHL 15. In 2015, during the NHL awards, it was announced that the cover of NHL 16 would feature Jonathan Toews and Patrick Kane carrying the Stanley Cup together. However, on August 12, 2015, EA announced that Kane would not be appearing on the cover or participating in any promotional activities for the game in light of a criminal investigation he was involved in. Instead, the cover featured Toews alone. At the 2016 NHL Awards, it was announced that Vladimir Tarasenko of the St. Louis Blues was to appear on the cover of NHL 17. On June 21, 2017, during the 2017 NHL Awards, EA announced that Connor McDavid of the Edmonton Oilers would be the cover athlete on NHL 18. Until NHL 21, regional covers were also produced featuring NHL players from that region.

List of Cover Stars

Commentary 

In NHLPA '93 and NHL '94, Emmy award-winning sportscaster Ron Barr gives a pre-game scouting report prior to each game. In the Genesis version of NHL 95, KNBR radio sportscaster John Shrader replaced Ron Barr in that duty. Live play-by-play commentary was introduced in the PC version of NHL 97. Jim Hughson, former play-by-play man for CBC's Hockey Night in Canada and also one of Canada's best-known hockey announcers, provided the play-by-play for much of the series. The last games in which he is one of the announcers are the PC and PS2 versions of NHL 09. Bill Clement was the sole commentator in the Nintendo 64 version of NHL 99. Gary Thorne provided the play-by-play commentary in all Xbox 360 and PlayStation 3 versions from NHL 07 through NHL 14. NBC Sports commentator Mike Emrick and Eddie Olczyk provided the play-by-play and color commentary on all platforms, with their first appearance together being in NHL 15 and last in NHL 19. James Cybulski is the current play-by-play commentator, starting with NHL 20. NHL 15 was also the first game to introduce an ice level analyst, with TSN analyst Ray Ferraro appearing in the Xbox One and PlayStation 4 versions of the game. Color commentary has been provided by Daryl Reaugh (NHL 98–99), Bill Clement (NHL 2000–2001, and NHL 07–14 for the Xbox 360 and PlayStation 3), Don Taylor (NHL 2002–2003), Craig Simpson (NHL 2004–09), Eddie Olczyk (NHL 15–19). Ferraro made the jump from ice-level analyst to full color commentator in NHL 20 (NHL 20–present).

Controversy 

One idea that has been widely discussed over many years within the fan community is a purported automatic built-in gameplay mechanism called ”ice tilt”, which modifies skaters' and/or goalies' and/or the referee's penalty-decision-making behavior irrationally to favor a worse player, a player on a losing streak or a player who is down by multiple goals. EA Sports has openly denied the existence of any such mechanism, instead saying that winning is a product of skill and the quality of the team's roster. However, EA once published a document about a feature called "Dynamic Difficulty Adjustment", which was interpreted by some as confirming the existence of ice tilt.

Soundtracks 
NHL 99 was the first game in the series to feature fully licensed music from David Bowie for the intro video. Since then, each game has had soundtracks of licensed music known as EA Sports Trax, with selections of punk, alternative, and rock music. Electronic and hip hop music was later added to the mix in later games. NHL 15 and NHL 16 on PlayStation 4 and Xbox One use an original orchestral score instead for the menus, while the soundtrack continues playing in the arenas. NHL 17 returned to the traditional EA Trax feature and also allowed the option to switch back to the original score from NHL 15.

See also 
 List of ice hockey video games
 Sports game

References

External links 
 
 

 
Electronic Arts franchises
Electronic Arts games
Video games developed in Canada
EA Sports games
Video game franchises introduced in 1991
Ice hockey video games
Video games developed in the United States